Pseudofulvia is a genus of saltwater clams, marine bivalve mollusks in the subfamily Laevicardiinae of the family Cardiidae, the cockles.

Species
 Pseudofulvia arago Vidal & Kirkendale, 2007
 Pseudofulvia caledonica Vidal & Kirkendale, 2007

References

External links
 Vidal J. & Kirkendale L. (2007). Ten new species of Cardiidae (Mollusca, Bivalvia) from New Caledonia and the tropical western Pacific. Zoosystema 29(1): 83-107
 Poorten, J.J. ter, 2005. Outline of a systematic index - Recent Cardiidae (Lamarck, 1809). VISAYA net
 Poorten, J.J. ter, 2009. The Cardiidae of the Panglao Marine Biodiversity Project 2004 and the Panglao 2005 Deep-Sea Cruise with descriptions of four new species (Bivalvia). Vita Malacologica 8: 9-96 

Cardiidae
Bivalve genera
Molluscs described in 2007